Kamiandougou is a rural commune in the Cercle of Ségou in the Ségou Region of Mali. The commune contains 18 villages in an area of approximately 311 square kilometers. In the 2009 census it had a population of 14313. The administrative center (chef-lieu) is the village of Nonongo which lies 94 km east-northeast of Ségou.

References

External links
.
.

Communes of Ségou Region